Čejkovice is a municipality and village in Hodonín District in the South Moravian Region of the Czech Republic. It has about 2,400 inhabitants.

Notable people
Tomáš Garrigue Masaryk (1850–1937), politician and the first president of Czechoslovakia; grew up here

References

Villages in Hodonín District
Moravian Slovakia